International High School at Prospect Heights is one of four schools on the former Prospect Heights High School campus in Brooklyn, New York. An Empowerment School, International High addresses the needs of recent immigrant students by teaching them fluency in reading, writing and speaking.

The International High School at Prospect Heights opened its doors to its first class in 2004, under the leadership of Alexandra Anormaliza.

Extracurricular activities
The International High School at Prospect Heights offers students many extracurricular  activities such as: African Club, French Club, Haitian Club, Latino/Spanish Club, Science Club, Drama Club, Guitar Ensemble, etc.

References
Notes

External links
NYCDE Portal: International High School at Prospect Heights

Public high schools in Brooklyn